Mukteshwar may refer to:

Towns 
 Mukteshwar, a town in the Nainital district of Uttarakhand, India

Railway station
 Mukteshwar, a railway station in Odisha, India

Temples 
 Muktesvara deula in Bhubaneshwar, Orissa, India
 Mukteshwar Devalay in the Juhu suburb of Mumbai, Maharashtra India

People 
 Mukteshwar (1574-1645), a medieval Indian saint, son of Eknath